USCGC Alder can refer to the following ships of the United States Coast Guard:

 , a lighthouse tender launched in 1917 for the United States Lighthouse Service. The vessel was acquired in 1922 by the United States Coast Guard and remained in service until sunk by a German U-boat on 15 March 1942.
 , a   launched in 2004.

United States Coast Guard ship names